Pleckstrin homology-like domain family A member 2 is a protein that in humans is encoded by the PHLDA2 gene.

This gene is one of several genes in the imprinted gene domain of 11p15.5, which is considered to be an important tumor suppressor gene region. Alterations in this region may be associated with the Beckwith-Wiedemann syndrome, Wilms tumor, rhabdomyosarcoma, adrenocortical carcinoma, and lung, ovarian, and breast cancer. Studies of the mouse gene, however, which is also located in an imprinted gene domain, have shown that the product of this gene regulates placental growth.

References

Further reading